Talakhadze is a Georgian surname. Notable people with the surname include:

Giorgi Talakhadze (born 1994), Georgian rugby union player
Lasha Talakhadze (born 1993), Georgian weightlifter 

Georgian-language surnames
Surnames of Georgian origin